Massimo del Pizzo is an Italian science fiction writer and critic. From the Abruzzo region, del Pizzo teaches French Language and Literature in the Facoltà di Lingue of the Università degli Studi di Bari. He published studies on literary utopias, on fantasy and on French scientific imagination writing.

On the fiction front, he published a number of short stories in newspapers, magazines and anthologies. Many of his stories verge on the dream-like, while other are closer to science-fiction.

Works

His works include:

L'opera di Rosny Aîné. Dal realismo al naturalismo, dal fantastico alla fantascienza, Schena, 1990
Alphonse Rabbe, la parola austera e la parola disperata, Schena, 1990
Viaggi e passaggi. Letture di Jules Verne, Solfanelli 1995
I microscopi dell'Altrove. Utopia, Fantastico, Fantascienza, B.A. Graphis, 1996
Maurice Renard. Gli occhi dello scriba, B.A. Graphis, 2000
Restif de la Bretonne e «Les Posthumes». Il diavolo in coppia, B.A. Graphis, 2001

As editor he worked on:

Racconti di fantascienza. Il mondo attraverso la letteratura di immaginazione scientifica,  Palumbo 2000.
Altri mondi, Nord.

References

External links
 Official University Site

Italian science fiction writers
Italian male non-fiction writers
Italian speculative fiction critics
Science fiction critics
Science fiction academics
Year of birth missing (living people)
Living people